Linda Lucía Callejas Maya is a Colombian model, singer, business administrator, and actress. She participated in the national beauty contest representing Antioquia in 1989.

Career
Linda Lucía Callejas entered the National Beauty Contest in 1989 representing Antioquia in Cartagena , where she won the Best Fantasy Costume award.

Filmography

Television

Cinema

Theater 

 Ruben's bolero
Hollywood Night "Angels and Roses"
 Infidels (Colombia)
 Love is stronger than death
 Soul friends
 The house of pleasure
 Death

Awards and nominations

TVyNovelas Awards

References

Living people
1970 births